Juan Fernando Vieytes Pérez, born in Montevideo on January 5, 1916, was a famous Uruguayan painter and visual artist. He won multiple national prizes before his death on April 7, 1962.

Art career 
Vieytes won his first Uruguayan National Art Prize for a painting he painted of his cousin, Margot Pérez.  Throughout his career, he was an important figure on the Uruguayan art scene,  and won a multitude of awards until his early death in 1962.

Awards

First place 

 1939 - 
 1940 - 
 1940 - Exposion de Pintura Francesa y Curso de Confrencias (Montevideo)
 1943 - 
 1943 - 
 1943 - 
 1943 -

Bronze medal 

 1946 - 
 1947 -

Personal life 
He was married to the famous Uruguayan actress Nelly Weissel, who he had a daughter with.

See also 

 Museo Nacional de Artes Visuales

References

 Obras expuestas en la Galería Nacional.
 Perfil detallado
 Galería Nacional Perfil

1916 births
1962 deaths
People from Montevideo
20th-century Uruguayan painters
Uruguayan male artists
Male painters
20th-century Uruguayan male artists